Rushville High School may refer to:

Gordon-Rushville High School — Nebraska
Rushville Consolidated High School — Indiana
Rushville-Industry High School — Illinois